Philippe Brun may refer to:

 Philippe Brun (musician)
 Philippe Brun (politician)